A special election was held in the U.S. state of Minnesota on February 12, 2013 to elect a new representative for District 19A in the Minnesota House of Representatives, caused by the resignation of Representative Terry Morrow on January 7, 2013. A primary election was held on January 29, 2013. The election coincided with the District 14A special election. Clark Johnson, the Minnesota Democratic–Farmer–Labor Party (DFL) nominee, won the special election.

Background
On December 19, 2012, Representative Terry Morrow announced he would resign to join the Uniform Law Commission as its legislative director. He resigned on January 7, 2013, the day before the beginning of the new session of the Minnesota Legislature.

Candidates

Minnesota Democratic–Farmer–Labor Party

Nominee
Clark Johnson (party endorsed), faculty member at Minnesota State University, Mankato

Withdrawn
Robin Courrier, teacher; leader of local teachers' union
Karl Johnson, farmer
Tim Strand, Mayor of St. Peter

Republican Party of Minnesota

Nominee
Allen Quist (party endorsed), 2012 Republican candidate for the 1st congressional district; two-time candidate for Governor of Minnesota; former member of the Minnesota House of Representatives

Withdrawn
Joel Brinker, former St. Peter city council member
Jim Golgart, Le Sueur County Veterans Services officer

Independence Party of Minnesota

Nominee
Tim Gieseke (party endorsed), small business owner

Primary election
The Minnesota Democratic–Farmer–Labor Party (DFL) did not endorse a candidate until after the deadline for withdrawing (January 16 at 5:00 p.m.), leaving the candidates that did not win the party endorsement unable to withdraw their candidacies, causing a primary election. The losing candidates said they would abide by the endorsement.

Results

Previous election results

References

External links
Information on the special election at the Minnesota Secretary of State website

Official campaign websites
Clark Johnson
Allen Quist
Tim Gieseke

House of Representatives
Minnesota special elections